Kabadougou Region is one of the 31 regions of Ivory Coast. Since its establishment in 2011, it has been one of two regions in Denguélé District. The seat of the region is Odienné and the region's population in the 2021 census was 289,806.

Kabadougou is currently divided into five departments: Gbéléban, Madinani, Odienné, Samatiguila, and Séguélon.

Notes

 
Regions of Denguélé District
States and territories established in 2011
2011 establishments in Ivory Coast